Umbro is a valorous (fortissimus)  warrior-priest of the Marruvians that appears in Book 7 of Virgil's  Aeneid and his role has received significant academic coverage.   Dinter  (2000, p167) reports several interpretation of his role. These include his being a part of the old Italy that needs to die, or on his death the end of a localism that is being replaced by the Trojan's founding of their new empire. He has the power to make snakes sleep but his herbs and hymns cannot save him from the Trojan's spear. Virgil's lamentation for his loss is described as being particularly beautiful and poignant by Parry (1963, p. 66):  For you the grove of Angitia mourned, and Fucinus' glassy waters,  And the clear lakes. (Te nemus Angitiae, vitrea te Fucinus unda, Te Uquidi flevere lacus).

Notes

Bibliography
 Dinter, M. (2005). Epic and Epigram—Minor Heroes in Virgil’s Aeneid. The Classical Quarterly, 55(1), 153-169.
 Horsfall, Nicholas  (2000) Virgil, Aeneid 7: A Commentary, Mnemos. bibliotheca classica Batava, Supplementum Leiden-Boston- Köln
 Putnam, Michael C. J. (1992) Umbro, Nireus and Love’s Threnody. Vergilius 38:12-23 pp. 12–23. JSTOR,
 Parry, A. (1963). The Two Voices of Virgil’s “Aeneid.” Arion: A Journal of Humanities and the Classics, 2(4), 66–80. 

Characters in the Aeneid